Gamochaeta antarctica, the Antarctic cudweed, is a species of flowering plant in the family Asteraceae. It is found only in the Falkland Islands in the South Atlantic Ocean, where its natural habitat is temperate dwarf shrub heath.

References

antarctica
Flora of the Falkland Islands
Endangered plants
Plants described in 1846
Taxonomy articles created by Polbot
Taxa named by Ángel Lulio Cabrera